Gerrit de Ruiter (28 September 1927 – 8 January 2010) was a Dutch field hockey player. He competed in the men's tournament at the 1960 Summer Olympics.

References

External links
 

1927 births
2010 deaths
Dutch male field hockey players
Olympic field hockey players of the Netherlands
Field hockey players at the 1960 Summer Olympics
Sportspeople from Enschede
20th-century Dutch people